The Perak State Legislative Assembly is the unicameral state legislature of the Malaysian state of Perak. It is composed of 59 members representing single-member constituencies throughout the state. Elections are held no more than five years apart, along with elections to the federal parliament and other state assemblies.

The Assembly convenes at the Bangunan Perak Darul Ridzuan in the state capital, Ipoh. At 59 seats, it is the largest state assembly among the 11 legislatures of the States of Malaya.

Current composition

Seating arrangement

Role
The Perak State Legislative Assembly enacts laws that apply in Perak. It must hold at least three sittings a year and table a budget in March and late October or early November. The Speaker presides over sittings in the Assembly and ensures order during debates. The present Speaker is Mohamad Zahir Abdul Khalid.

The majority party or coalition in the Assembly forms the state government, led by the Menteri Besar. He appoints the state executive council, or EXCO (Majlis Mesyuarat Kerajaan), drawing from members of the Assembly.

Speakers of The Assembly

Perak state election, 2022

Perak state election, 2018

|-
! style="background-color:#E9E9E9;text-align:left;vertical-align:top;" |
! style="background-color:#E9E9E9;text-align:right;" |Votes
! style="background-color:#E9E9E9;text-align:right;" |% of vote
! style="background-color:#E9E9E9;text-align:right;" |Seats
! style="background-color:#E9E9E9;text-align:right;" |% of seats
! style="background-color:#E9E9E9;text-align:right;" |+/–
|-
|- style="background-color:#F0F8FF;"
| style="text-align:left;" | Pakatan Harapan || 594,810 || 50.06 || 29 || 49.2 ||6 
|-
| style="text-align:left;padding-left:1em;"| Democratic Action Party (DAP) || 303,501 || 25.54 || 18 || 30.5 || 
|-
| style="text-align:left;padding-left:1em;"| National Trust Party (AMANAH) || 103,910 || 8.74 || 6 || 11.9 || 6
|-
| style="text-align:left;padding-left:1em;"| People's Justice Party (PKR) || 120,646 || 10.15 || 4 || 6.8 || 1
|-
| style="text-align:left;padding-left:1em;"| Malaysian United Indigenous Party (PPBM) || 66,753 || 5.62 || 1 || 1.7 || 1
|-
|- style="background-color:#F0F8FF;"
| style="text-align:left;" | Barisan Nasional || 395,708 || 33.30 || 27 || 45.8 ||4 
|-
| style="text-align:left;padding-left:1em;"| United Malays National Organisation (UMNO) || 303,022 || 25.50 || 27 || 47.4 || 3
|-
| style="text-align:left;padding-left:1em;"| Malaysian Chinese Association (MCA) || 69,542 || 5.85 || 0 || 0.0 || 1
|-
| style="text-align:left;padding-left:1em;"| Malaysian Indian Congress (MIC) || 7,573 || 0.64 || 0 || 0.0 ||  
|-
| style="text-align:left;padding-left:1em;"| Malaysian People's Movement Party (GERAKAN) || 15,571 || 1.31 || 0 || 0.0 || 
|-
|- style="background-color:#F0F8FF;"
| style="text-align:left;" | Pan-Malaysian Islamic Party (PAS) || 194,735 || 16.39 || 3 || 5.1 || 2
|-
|- style="background-color:#F0F8FF;"
| style="text-align:left;" | Others || 2,762 || 0.23 || 0 || 0.0 || 
|-
| style="text-align:left;padding-left:1em;"|  Socialist Party of Malaysia (PSM) || 2,551 || 0.21 || 0 || 0.0 || 
|-
| style="text-align:left;padding-left:1em;"|  Pan-Malaysian Islamic Front (BERJASA) || 211 || 0.02 || 0 || 0.0 || 
|-
|- style="background-color:#F0F8FF;"
| style="text-align:left;" | Independents || 277 || 0.02 || 0 || 0.0 || 
|-
|- style="background-color:#F0F8FF;"
| style="text-align:left;" | Overall total || 1,188,292 || 100 || 59 || 100 || 
|}
}}

Perak state election, 2013

|-
!style="background-color:#E9E9E9" align=left valign=top|
!style="background-color:#E9E9E9" align=right|Candidate
!style="background-color:#E9E9E9" align=right|Vote
!style="background-color:#E9E9E9" align=right|% vote
!style="background-color:#E9E9E9" align=right|Seat
!style="background-color:#E9E9E9" align=right|% seat
!style="background-color:#E9E9E9" align=right|+/–
|-
|-
|align=left|Barisan Nasional (BN): || 59 || 506,947 || 44.40 || 31 || 52.54 || 3
|-
|align=left|United Malay National Organization (UMNO)  || 36 || || || 30 || 50.84 || 3
|-
|align=left|Malaysian Chinese Association (MCA) || 15 || || || 1 || 1.69 || 
|-
|align=left|Parti Gerakan Rakyat Malaysia (Gerakan) || 4 || || || 0 || 0.00 || 
|-
|align=left|Malaysian Indian Congress (MIC) || 3 || || || 0 || 0.00 || 
|-
|align=left|Parti Progresif Penduduk Malaysia (PPP) || 1 || || || 0 || 0.00 || 
|-
|align=left|Pakatan Rakyat: || 59 || 625,710 || 54.80 || 28 || 47.46 || 3
|-
|align=left|Democratic Action Party (DAP) || 18 || || || 18 || 30.51 || 
|-
|align=left|People's Justice Party (PKR) || 20 || || || 5 || 8.47 || 2
|-
|align=left|Malaysian Islamic Party (PAS) || 21 || || || 5 || 8.47 || 1
|-
|align=left|Independent (and others) || 25 || 9,122 || 0.80 || 0 || 0.00 || 
|-
|align=left| Total || 144 || 1,141,779
 || 100.00 || 59 || 100.00 || 
|}

Perak state election, 2008

The following is the results of the 2008 state assembly elections. Three Pakatan Rakyat assemblymen have since quit their parties to become independents caucusing with Barisan Nasional, triggering the 2009 Perak constitutional crisis. The Pakatan Rakyat government formed after the election then been removed from power.

Election pendulum 
The 15th General Election witnessed 33 governmental seats and 26 non-governmental seats filled the Perak State Legislative Assembly. The government side has 15 safe seats and 3 fairly safe seats, while the non-government side has 3 fairly safe seats and no safe seats.

List of Assemblies

Notes

See also
 List of State Seats Representatives in Malaysia
 State legislative assemblies of Malaysia
 2009 Perak constitutional crisis
 2020 vote of no confidence in the Faizal Azumu ministry

References

External links
 Perak State Government official website

 
Unicameral legislatures
Politics of Perak
State legislatures of Malaysia